MonoTorrent is a cross-platform .NET Standard 2.0 compatible library which implements the BitTorrent protocol. As a result, MonoTorrent can be compiled and executed on every major operating system, including smart phones, IoT or other mobile devices.

The aim of this library is not to provide a rich graphical interface for users to interact with, but rather to provide a rich programming API to allow a developer to create a GUI using the library without having to worry about reinventing the wheel by implementing the BitTorrent specification themselves.

As a result, this should allow developers to embed the library into a wide variety of applications with ease.

The library was initially developed under the 2006 Google Summer of Code. It now resides in the public Git repository for Mono.

See also
 Comparison of BitTorrent libraries

References

External links
 Official MonoTorrent blog
 The source

MacOS programming tools
Programming tools for Windows
BitTorrent
Software using the MIT license
Free software programmed in C Sharp